Mirosław Więckowski (born 5 June 1952) is a Polish luger. He competed at the 1972 Winter Olympics and the 1976 Winter Olympics.

References

1952 births
Living people
Polish male lugers
Olympic lugers of Poland
Lugers at the 1972 Winter Olympics
Lugers at the 1976 Winter Olympics
People from Karkonosze County